USS Merito (SP-279) was a United States Navy patrol vessel in commission in 1917.

Merito was built by Swazey, Raymond and Page. The U.S. Navy acquired her from her owner, B. C. Dunlap of New York City, on a free lease basis on 23 May 1917 for World War I service as a patrol vessel. She was commissioned on either 1 July 1917 or 11 July 1917 as USS Merito (SP-279).

Assigned to the 3rd Naval District, Merito was employed as a section patrol boat.

Merito was returned to Dunlap on 19 December 1917.

Notes

References

 

Patrol vessels of the United States Navy
World War I patrol vessels of the United States